Egling is a municipality in the district of Bad Tölz-Wolfratshausen in Bavaria.

References

Bad Tölz-Wolfratshausen